The 1963 NCAA Swimming and Diving Championships were contested in March 1963 at the Willis Casey Natatorium at North Carolina State University in Raleigh, North Carolina at the 40th annual NCAA-sanctioned swim meet to determine the team and individual national champions of men's collegiate swimming and diving in the United States.

USC topped the team standings, finishing only four points ahead of challengers Yale, and claimed their second title (and second title in three years). 

This was the final combined competition before the establishment of separate championships for the NCAA's University and College Divisions in 1964.

Program changes
Three events were removed from the event program:
220-yard freestyle
440-yard freestyle
1,500-meter freestyle
Four new events were added to the program:
200-yard freestyle
500-yard freestyle
1,650-yard freestyle 
400-yard individual medley

Team standings
Note: Top 10 only
(H) = Hosts
Full results

See also
List of college swimming and diving teams

References

NCAA Division I Men's Swimming and Diving Championships
NCAA Swimming And Diving Championships
NCAA Swimming And Diving Championships
NCAA Swimming And Diving Championships